This is a timeline of women's suffrage in South Dakota. The early history of women's suffrage in the state is shared with North Dakota. When South Dakota became a state, it held a voter referendum in 1890 on an equal suffrage amendment. This effort failed, but suffragists continued to organize and lobby the legislature to pass voter referendums. None passed until 1918. South Dakota ratified the Nineteenth Amendment on December 4, 1919.

19th century

1860s 
1868

 Enos Stutsman proposes a women's suffrage bill in the Dakota Territorial House.

1870s 
1872

 The Territorial Legislature nearly passes a full women's suffrage bill, losing by one vote.

1879

 The Dakota Territory gives women the right to vote in school meetings.

1880s 
1881

 Women are allowed to become county superintendents of public education.

1883

 A change in the way people would vote on school issues disenfranchised many women voters in the territory. The Territory wanted women to use separate ballots for school issues.
Summer: Matilda Joslyn Gage lectures on women's suffrage in the territory.
September 6: A women's suffrage petition signed by 1,000 people was presented to the Sioux Falls convention that was deciding whether or not to split the territory.
1884

 The South Dakota Republican Party adopts universal suffrage in their party platform.

1885

 Activists in the southern part of the Dakota territory, working with the Woman's Christian Temperance Union (WCTU), work on petitions to influence the territorial legislature to support women's suffrage.
John Pickler proposes a women's suffrage bill in the Territorial House, which passed. It is vetoed by Governor Gilbert A. Pierce.
Marietta Bones starts a suffrage organization in Webster.

1887

 A school suffrage bill expanding the rights of women to vote for all kinds of school issues passes.
 A full women's suffrage bill is proposed, but does not pass the territorial legislature.

1888

 A call for a women's suffrage group was put out in Grand Forks. On April 12, a meeting was held to form a women's suffrage group that had a packed crowd.

1889

 After the Dakota territory is admitted as two states, two distinct women's suffrage movements emerge.
October 21: The South Dakota Equal Suffrage Association (SDESA) is formed in Huron by Emma Smith DeVoe and her husband, John.
November 11: Susan B. Anthony starts a lecture tour in South Dakota.

1890s 
1890

 February: The Picklers and Alonzo Wardall ask NWSA for organizers and funds for the upcoming suffrage campaign.
June: Sophia M. Harden and other activists speak for women's suffrage at the state Democratic Party convention at Aberdeen.
July 7–8: The SDESA holds a state suffrage convention in Huron.
August 25–26: SDESA holds a second women's suffrage convention in Mitchell in order to strategize for the upcoming women's suffrage referendum vote.
August 27: Suffrage leaders are able to speak at the Reuplican party convention in Mitchell.
August: A suffrage convention was held in Grant County. The Grant County Equal Suffrage Association is formed.
November 4: The women's suffrage amendment is defeated.
The Athol Equal Suffrage Association is created.
The Grant County Equal Suffrage Association is formed.
1892

 The Prohibition Party passed resolutions for equal suffrage and equal pay.
 State suffrage convention was held in Huron.

1893

 A women's suffrage amendment bill is lobbied for and passed in the state legislature.
July 4: Suffragists in Onida raise money for campaigns in Colorado, Kansas, and New York.
September: SDESA holds its annual meeting in Aberdeen.

1894

 November: The state women's suffrage amendment is defeated.
1895

 September 16–17: WCTU and SDESA hold annual conventions in Pierre.

1896

 December 3–4: SDESA holds their annual convention in Salem.

1897

 October: The Union County Equal Suffrage Association is formed.
Suffragists work towards influencing the state legislature to pass another state amendment bill.
1898

 July: Anna Simmons and Enma Cranmer lead the Equal Suffrage Day at Lake Madison Chautauqua.
November: The state women's suffrage amendment was defeated.
1899

 September: SDESA holds a joint convention with the state WCTU in Madison.

20th century

1900s 
1900

 January 15: U.S. Senator, R. F. Pettigrew presents a petition for a federal suffrage amendment to the U.S. Senate.
 September: SDESA holds their annual meeting in Brookings.

1901

 The South Dakota Political Equality Association (SDPEA) is formed.
February 1: State WCTU members, Luella Ramsey and Philena Everett Johnson lobby for a state suffrage amendment.
Spring: SDESA organizes local Political Equality Clubs to help distribute literature and better reach more women.

1902

 Women's suffrage convention called to be held in Watertown in October.

1903

 Women's suffrage petition for a state suffrage amendment is rejected by the secretary of state.
1904

 The South Dakota Prohibition Party's platform includes equal women's suffrage.

1906

 Suffragists petition the state legislature to consider women's suffrage.
1907

 March: The business committee of SDESA meets in Highmore.
 September 17–18: SDESA holds its annual meeting in Pierre.

1908

 SDESA raises money by the foot, literally asking people to send them enough pennies to fit on twelves inches of cardboard.

1909

 Suffragists petition the state legislature to pass a women's suffrage amendment referendum.
June 18: SDESA holds their suffrage convention in Aberdeen.
November 3–5: The state suffrage convention is held in Sioux Falls.

1910s 
1910

 The Philip Suffrage Club is organized in Philip.
A major suffrage campaign is enacted, bringing in activists from around the state and country, including Anna Howard Shaw.
November: The women's suffrage referendum is defeated.

1911

 January: Activists lobby the state legislature on women's suffrage.
February: Suffragists put forward the idea that the state constitution already allowed state and county offices.
The South Dakota Universal Franchise League is formed by Mamie Shields Pyle.
1912

 January: Pro-suffrage newspaper, South Dakota Messenger, is first published.
July: A state suffrage convention is held in Huron.

1913

 The women's suffrage amendment bill is the first to pass the legislative session.
March: South Dakota is represented in the Woman Suffrage Procession by marchers and a golden chariot.
July: SDUFL holds their annual meeting in Huron.

1915

 Winter: A women's suffrage amendment is passed by the state legislature and will go to a voter referendum.

1916

 Anti-suffragists become an auxiliary of the National Association Opposed to Woman Suffrage (NAOWS).
August 7: Suffrage Day is celebrated in South Dakota.
October: The South Dakota Association Opposed to Woman Suffrage began an anti-suffrage campaign that included Minnie Bronson.
 November: Voter referendum on the women's suffrage amendment does not pass, but more people support women's suffrage this time.
1918

 November 6: Women's suffrage passes with the passage of the Citizenship Amendment.

1919

 December 4: South Dakota ratifies the Nineteenth Amendment.

1920s 
1924

 The Indian Citizenship Act is passed, but South Dakota refuses to follow the law and allow Native Americans, as U.S. Citizens to vote.

See also 

 List of South Dakota suffragists
 Women's suffrage in South Dakota
 Women's suffrage in states of the United States
 Women's suffrage in the United States

References

Sources

External links 
 Timeline of South Dakota Suffrage

South Dakota suffrage
Timelines of states of the United States
Suffrage referendums